Kundian Nuclear Fuel Complex (KNFC) is a nuclear fuel fabrication plant located at Kundian, Mianwali District,  Punjab, Pakistan.

History
In 2006, the PAEC started work another nuclear fuel fabrication plant — Pakistan Nuclear Power Fuel Complex — located 175 kilometers south near Islamabad. An indigenous Nuclear Fuel Fabrication Complex at Kundian, known as Kundian Nuclear Fuel Complex (KNFC), already exists which was built by PAEC under Munir Ahmad Khan and completed by 1980. 

Kundian Nuclear Fuel Complex is a reactor uranium fuel fabrication facility situated near the Chashma Nuclear Power Plant. With an annual production capacity of 24 tons, the facility has been manufacturing fuel for the KANUPP reactor since 1978. The Nuclear Fuel Plant is now known as KNC I - Kundian Nuclear Complex I.

See also

 Nuclear power in Pakistan

External links
 World Nuclear Organisation

References 

Nuclear power in Pakistan